Gyula Feldmann (16 November 1880, Szeged — 31 October 1955) was a Hungarian football player and coach.

Playing career
During his playing career he played with Nemzeti SC and MTK Budapest in the Nemzeti Bajnokság I.

Coaching career
After a playing career with several Hungarian teams, he became a coach and coached MTK Budapest from 1927 to 1928. In 1928 he became Fiorentina boss, and in 1931 he replaced Tony Cargnelli at the helm of Palermo, leading the rosanero to a Serie A promotion. In 1934–1935 he obtained a Serie A runners-up position with Ambrosiana-Inter. He was sacked during the 1935–1936 season, and later became head coach of Torino.

In 1938 he took charge of SK Jugoslavija in the Yugoslav First League. He took charge of SK Jugoslavia in July that year replacing Károly Nemes who took charge of SK Bata Borovo after the departure of Bilek.

References 

Jewish footballers
Hungarian footballers
Hungarian expatriate footballers
Hungary international footballers
Association football defenders
Hungarian football managers
Ferencvárosi TC footballers
Expatriate footballers in Czechoslovakia
Palermo F.C. managers
ACF Fiorentina managers
Torino F.C. managers
Inter Milan managers
FC Petrolul Ploiești managers
SV Werder Bremen managers
Serie A managers
Hungarian expatriate sportspeople in Czechoslovakia
Hungarian expatriate sportspeople in Italy
Hungarian expatriate sportspeople in Yugoslavia
Expatriate football managers in Italy
Expatriate football managers in Yugoslavia
SK Jugoslavija managers
Jewish Hungarian sportspeople
Sportspeople from Szeged
1880 births
1955 deaths
Hungarian expatriate football managers